De Vrouwbuurstermolen is a smock mill in Vrouwenparochie, Friesland, Netherlands which was built in 1862 and is in working order. The mill is listed as a Rijksmonument.

History
Little is known of the early history of the mill. A mill stood here in 1570. It was almost certainly a post mill. A rye mill was marked on a map dated 1832. This was a smock mill. De Vrouwbuurstermolen was built on the base of this mill in 1862. The mill was owned by Johannes Jans van der Ley in 1869. The mill was then a corn and pearl barley mill. The mill worked until 1954. At that time, it was fitted with a secondhand pair of sails with leading edges on the Dekker system. These sails were shorter than the other pair, having been acquired secondhand from a demolished drainage mill. In 1962, a society was formed to restore the mill. Restoration took place from 1963 to 1967. The mill gas worked regularly since then. A further restoration in 2007 saw the mill fitted with a sprinkler system in case of fire. The mill is listed as a Rijksmonument, No. 9526.

Description

De Vrouwbuurstermolen is what the Dutch describe as a "Stellingmolen". It is a smock mill on a wooden base. The smock and cap are thatched. The mill is winded by tailpole and winch. The sails are Common sails. The sails are carried on a cast-iron windshaft. The windshaft also carries the wooden brake wheel, which has 56 cogs. This drives the wallower (29 cogs) at  the top of the upright shaft. At the bottom of the upright shaft is the great spur wheel, which has 88 cogs. The great spur wheel drives two pair of French Burr millstones via lantern pinion stone nuts which have 22 staves each. Both pairs of millstones are  diameter.

Millers
Johannes Jans van der Ley (1869- )

References for above:-

Public access
De Vrouwbuurstermolen is open to the public on  the first Saturday in the month between 09:00 and 12:00, or by appointment.

References

Windmills in Friesland
Windmills completed in 1862
Smock mills in the Netherlands
Grinding mills in the Netherlands
Agricultural buildings in the Netherlands
Rijksmonuments in Friesland
Octagonal buildings in the Netherlands
1862 establishments in the Netherlands
Waadhoeke
19th-century architecture in the Netherlands